Malcolm Winfield Travis (born February 15, 1953) is an American drummer from Boston, Massachusetts, best known for his work with Human Sexual Response, The Zulus, Sugar (with Bob Mould and David Barbe), No Man (with Roger Miller), and Kustomized (with Peter Prescott).

References 

Living people
1953 births
American punk rock drummers
American male drummers
Sugar (American band) members
Musicians from Boston
People from Niskayuna, New York
American rock drummers
20th-century American drummers
20th-century American male musicians